Dukuly or Dukule’O  is a portuguese surname. Notable people with the surname include:

Neymar Dukuly,  journalist 
Abraham Dukuly (born 2000), Ghanaian-Canadian soccer player 
Chris Dukuly (born 1991), football player
Momolu Dukuly (1903–1980), politician 
Danielle Dukuly (born 2008),  girl

Surnames of Portuguese origin